Çiçekdere is a village in the Bingöl District, Bingöl Province, Turkey. The village is populated by Kurds of the Nakşan tribe and had a population of 153 in 2021.

The hamlets of Eskimezra, Kuşluca and Yuvacık are attached to the village.

References 

Villages in Bingöl District
Kurdish settlements in Bingöl Province